Annie Rix Militz (1856–1924) was an American author and spiritual leader. An early organizer of the New Thought Movement, she is best known as the founder of Home of Truth.  With her sister Harriet Hale Rix, Annie Rix Militz was a founder of the West Coast Metaphysical Bureau, a group whose aim was to study philosophies and religions.

Biography 

Annie Rix Militz was born in California in March, 1856, the first child of Hale and Alice P. Rix.

She was a schoolteacher in San Francisco in her early thirties when she attended a class taught by Emma Curtis Hopkins, the New Thought "teacher of teachers".  During the meeting Annie found herself healed of both a migraine and deafness in one ear.

That same year, 1887, saw Annie, Harriet, and Sadie Gorie found the Christian Science Home, soon renamed the Home of Truth.  In 1890, she moved to Chicago to study at Emma Curtis Hopkins' Christian Science Theological Seminary and was ordained, along with Charles and Myrtle Fillmore, the following year.

At the World's Columbian Exposition in 1893 in Chicago, Illinois, she met the Hindu teacher Swami Vivekananda, an event that influenced her to turn away from her formerly Christian view of New Thought to become inclusively interfaith. Her writings emphasize methods of healing and techniques for the development of mental powers.  In 1911 she broke with Unity Church to promote her own emerging interfaith New Thought teachings.

The 1915 International New Thought Alliance (INTA) conference, held in conjunction with the Panama–Pacific International Exposition—a world's fair that took place in San Francisco—featured New Thought speakers from far and wide. The PPIE organizers were so favorably impressed by the INTA convention that they declared a special "New Thought Day" at the fair and struck a commemorative bronze medal for the occasion, which was presenting to the INTA delegates, led by Annie Rix Militz. 
 Militz was a past president of the International New Thought Alliance.

Militz and her sister are best known today as the founders, in 1905, of The Home of Truth, an independent New Thought denomination which is a member of INTA, located in Alameda, California. Annie and Harriet are buried in the Rix family crypt with their parents and siblings at the San Francisco Columbarium.

Bibliography
Rix is the author of these books:

Concentration (also known as "The Nature of Concentration". (1918)
Primary Lessons in Christian Living and Healing
Renewal of the Body
The Sermon on the mount, an interpretation (1916)
Spiritual Housekeeping
Prosperity
I am myself
None of these things move me
All things are possible to them that believe
The wonderful wishers of wishing well

She was the editor of and a contributor to:

Master Mind Magazine, October 1911 to March 1919

See also
 List of New Thought writers
 List of New Thought organizations
 Law of attraction (New Thought)
 Panentheism

References

External links
 Biography of Annie Rix Militz at The Home of Truth web site
 Biography of Annie Rix Militz at the wwwhubs web site

1856 births
1924 deaths
New Thought writers
Writers from California
American spiritual writers